The Mayoral election of 1949 in Pittsburgh, Pennsylvania was held on Tuesday, November 8, 1949. David Lawrence of the Democratic Party was reelected to a second term. Despite commanding a powerful position within both local politics and the state party, Lawrence faced a major primary challenge after he failed to gain the endorsement of the AFL–CIO. However, he achieved a moderate victory over union leader Ed Leonard, in part due to the surprising support of the Republican business community, which championed Lawrence's urban renewal projects. After the primary scare, Lawrence defeated Republican Timothy "Tice" Ryan, an attorney, by what was then the biggest margin in city mayoral history.

Results

References

 

1949 Pennsylvania elections
1949
1949 United States mayoral elections
Mayoral Election, 1949
November 1949 events in the United States